Tami J. Green is an American politician of the Democratic Party. She is a former member of the Washington House of Representatives, representing the 28th district.

References

Further reading
 Biography on Washington State Legislature website

Year of birth missing (living people)
Living people
Democratic Party members of the Washington House of Representatives
Women state legislators in Washington (state)
21st-century American women